The year 1986 in architecture involved some significant architectural events and new buildings.

Events
March 15 – Hotel New World disaster: The six-story Lian Yak Building (1971) in Singapore, housing the Hotel New World, collapses in less than a minute due to structural failure, perhaps caused by a gas explosion, trapping 50 people and killing 33.
undated
Construction work begins on Park Pobedy station in the Moscow Metro.
schmidt hammer lassen architects founded in Aarhus, Denmark.

Buildings and structures

Buildings opened

January 17 – The Buenos Aires Argentina Temple is dedicated by Thomas S. Monson.
May 11 – The Estadio Metropolitano Roberto Meléndez, in Barranquilla, Colombia.
July 29 – Glasgow Sheriff Court Building in Glasgow, Scotland, formally opened by Queen Elizabeth II of the United Kingdom.
September 14 – Museum Ludwig and Kölner Philharmonie in Cologne, Germany, designed by Peter Busmann and Godfrid Haberer.
October 23 – The Beirut Memorial in Jacksonville, North Carolina, USA, is dedicated.
October 26 – The nave of Hallgrímskirkja, a church in Reykjavík, Iceland, is consecrated.
November 18 – The Lloyd's Building in the City of London, UK
December 24 – The Lotus Temple in New Delhi, India, designed by Fariborz Sahba.

Buildings completed
 Museum Tower in Miami, Florida, United States.
 Rialto Towers in Melbourne, Australia.
 Temasek Tower in Singapore.
 The AXA Center in New York City, United States.
 The Dakin Building in Brisbane, California, United States.
 The Robot Building in Bangkok, Thailand.
 Nabemba Tower, Brazzaville, Republic of the Congo.
 The Fernmeldeturm Münster in Münster, Germany.
 The Tortoise Mountain TV Tower in Wuhan, China.
 The Town Pavilion in Downtown Kansas City, Missouri, United States.
 Zendstation Roosendaal in Roosendaal, Netherlands.
 The Lipstick Building in New York City, United States.
 1221 Brickell Building in Miami, Florida, United States.
 701 Brickell Avenue in Miami, Florida, United States.
 Henbury Hall, Cheshire, England, designed by Julian Bicknell after Palladio as depicted by Felix Kelly.
 Y Pencadlys (County Hall), headquarters of Gwynedd County Council in Caernarfon, Wales, designed by Dewi-Prys Thomas (died 1985) and executed by Council architects Merfyn Roberts and Terry Potter.
 Russian State Scientific Center of Robotics and Technical Cybernetics, Saint Petersburg, designed by B. I. Artiushin and S. V. Savin.
 Te Rata Bridge, King Country, New Zealand (collapses 1994).

Awards
 Aga Khan Prize – Rifat Chadirji.
 AIA Gold Medal – Arthur Charles Erickson.
 Architecture Firm Award – Esherick Homsey Dodge & Davis.
 Grand prix national de l'architecture – Adrien Fainsilber.
 Pritzker Prize – Gottfried Boehm.
 Prix de l'Équerre d'Argent – Adrien Fainsilber.
 RAIA Gold Medal – Richard Butterworth.
 RIBA Royal Gold Medal – Arata Isozaki.
Twenty-five Year Award – Solomon R. Guggenheim Museum.

Births

Deaths
 February 6 – Minoru Yamasaki, American architect (born 1912)
 February 21 – Mart Stam, Dutch architect (born 1899)
 May – Ben-Ami Shulman, Israeli-American architect (born 1907)
 Werner Schindler, Swiss architect (born 1905)

References

 
20th-century architecture